This is a list of political parties in Trentino, including both active parties and historical regional parties.

Parties
Current parties
Northern League Trentino (Lega Nord Trentino)
Democratic Party (Partito Democratico)
Trentino Tyrolean Autonomist Party (Partito Autonomista Trentino Tirolese)
Five Star Movement (Movimento Cinque Stelle)
Future 2018 (Futura 2018)
Article One (Articolo Uno)
Federation of the Greens (Federazione dei Verdi)
Trentino Civic List (Civica Trentina)
Union for Trentino (Unione per il Trentino)
Trentino Project (Progetto Trentino)
Popular Autonomists (Autonomisti Popolari)
Forward Italy  (Forza Italia)
Act for Trentino (Agire per il Trentino)
Union of the Centre (Unione di Centro)
Dynamic Autonomy (Autonomia Dinamica)
Brothers of Italy (Fratelli d'Italia)
Italian Left (Sinistra Italiana)
Italian Socialist Party (Partito Socialista Italiano)
Communist Refoundation Party (Partito della Rifondazione Comunista)
Fassa Association (Associazione Fassa)
Ladin Autonomist Union (Unione Autonomista Ladina)

Former regional parties
Anti-Autonomistic National League (Lega Nazionale Anti-Autonomistica)
Alliance of Independents (Alleanza Indipendenti)
Independent Autonomists (Autonomisti Indipendenti)
Craftsman-Farmer Alliance (Alleanza Contadina Artigiana)
New Left (Nuova Sinistra–Neue Linke)
Union of Independents for Trentino (Unione Indipendenti per il Trentino)
Trentino Tyrolean People's Party (Partito Popolare Trentino Tirolese)
Trentino Tyrolean Autonomist Union (Unione Autonomista Trentino Tirolese)
Integral Autonomy (Autonomia Integrale)
Trentino Autonomy League (Lega Autonomia Trentino)
Alliance for Trentino (Alleanza per il Trentino)
Integral Autonomy (Autonomia Integrale)
Trentino Autonomists (Autonomisti Trentini)
Trentino Tomorrow (Trentino Domani)
Daisy Civic List (Civica Margherita)
Loyal to Trentino (Leali al Trentino)
United Valleys (Valli Unite)
Administer Trentino (Amministrare il Trentino)
Together for Autonomy (Insieme per l'Autonomia)
Autonomy 2020 (Autonomia 2020)

See also
List of political parties in Italy